Llamil Simes  (died 20 February 1980) was an Argentine football striker.
Simes began his career with Club Atlético Huracán in 1943. He played for the club through 1947, then he joined Racing Club de Avellaneda from 1948 to 1955, before finishing his career with Club Atlético Tigre in 1956. He led the Primera Division in scoring during the 1949 season, tallying 26 goals for Racing, and is one of the league's all-time leading scorers.

References

External links
Llamil Simes at BDFA.com.ar 

Year of birth missing
1980 deaths
Argentine footballers
Argentine Primera División players
Club Atlético Huracán footballers
Racing Club de Avellaneda footballers
Club Atlético Tigre footballers
Sportspeople from Córdoba Province, Argentina
Association football forwards